World Funeral is the eighth studio album by Swedish black metal band Marduk. It was recorded and mixed at The Abyss between September and November 2002 and was released on March 25 the next year by Regain Records. The track listing of the album is organized as to create a dynamic change of paces and atmospheres, the tracks generally alternating between a fast, slow, fast, etc. pattern.

Balancing fast tracks with mid-paced tracks, it was a disappointment for fans expecting another head-to-toe fast album a la Panzer Division Marduk. Many fans suggested the band was going for a more commercial "mainstream" approach while others complimented their attempt to broaden their sound. World Funeral is the first Marduk album to feature Emil Draguntinovic on drums, the last to feature Legion on vocals and B. War on bass, and the last to feature mixing by Peter Tägtgren.

A music video was released for the title song.

Track listing

Composition
 "Blackcrowned" is an adaptation of Music for the Funeral of Queen Mary by English Baroque composer Henry Purcell.
 The song "Hearse" is based upon the horror film Phantasm by Don Coscarelli.
 The band used Fredman's Epistle No. 81, Märk hur vår skugga by the Swedish 18th century poet and composer Carl Michael Bellman for the mid-paced track "Castrum Doloris".
 The intro for the song "With Satan and Victorious Weapons" is a sample from the movie The Name of the Rose.

Personnel
Marduk
 Legion – vocals, guitar solos
 Morgan Steinmeyer Håkansson – lead guitars
 B. War – bass
 Emil Dragutinovic – drums

Guest
 Peter Tägtgren – mixing

References

2003 albums
Marduk (band) albums
Regain Records albums